Nyíribrony is a village in Szabolcs-Szatmár-Bereg county, in the Northern Great Plain region of eastern Hungary.

Geography

References

TÖRTÉNELEM

Nyíribrony község neve elõször a XIV. század elsõ felében tûnik fel az itt élõ nemesek nevében. Birtokosai voltak a Kemecseiek, a Bogdányiak és a Jármyak.

Populated places in Szabolcs-Szatmár-Bereg County